HBJ may refer to:

 HVJ Gas Pipeline, also known as HBJ Gas Pipeline, in India
 Habibganj railway station, in Bhopal, India
 Halmstad Bolmen Railway, a defunct Swedish railway
 Hamad bin Jassim bin Jaber Al Thani, former prime minister and foreign minister of Qatar 
 Harcourt Brace Jovanovich, a defunct American publisher
 HBJ model, message-passing in parallel computing